Haran or Aran ( Hārān) is a man in the Book of Genesis in the Hebrew Bible. He died in Ur of the Chaldees, was a son of Terah, and brother of Abraham. Through his son Lot, Haran was the ancestor of the Moabites and Ammonites.

Haran and his family
Terah, a descendant of Shem son of Noah, was the father of Abram/Abraham, Nahor, and Haran. Their home's location is not certain, but it is usually supposed to have been in Mesopotamia. Besides Lot and Milcah, Haran fathered a daughter Iscah.

After Haran died in Ur of the Chaldees 'before his father Terah', his family travelled towards Canaan, the Promised Land. However, Terah stopped at Charan (or Haran [Hebrew חָרָן, Ḥārān]) and settled there, as did Nahor and Milcah, whereas Lot accompanied Abraham and others onwards to Canaan.

Etymology
The name Haran possibly comes from the Hebrew word har, = "mountain", with a West Semitic suffix appearing with proper names, anu/i/a. Thus, it has been suggested that Haran may mean "mountaineer". Personal names which resemble Haran include ha-ri and ha-ru, from texts of second millennium BC Mari and Alalakh, and ha-ar-ri, from one of the Amarna letters—but their meanings are uncertain. The initial element of Haran can be found in the Phoenician personal name hr-b`l, and also in the Israelite personal name hryhw from Gibeon.

Others called Haran
Haran is the English name of two other people mentioned in the Bible.
 Haran, son of Caleb ( – Ḥārān). 
 Haran, son of Shimei ( – Hārān). He was a Levite who lived in the time of David and Solomon.

See also
 Harran
 Sabians

References

Family of Abraham
Lot (biblical person)
Noach (parashah)
Ur of the Chaldees